Nogokpo is a small village located in the Ketu South Municipal of the Volta Region of Ghana along the Trans–West African Coastal Highway.

History

Nogokpo was founded by Torgbui Saba. He migrated from Agbozume Sukladzi and was one of the brave war captains of the Somey State. Saba’s ancestors originated from Ningo and were displaced by the Akwamu wars.
In order to strengthen himself spiritually for war, he embarked on spiritual journey to Dahomey and came back with Zakadza, the Yewe god of thunder similar to Shango  cult of the Yoruba or Thor of the ancient Scandinavians.
A misunderstanding with the town folks of Agbozume compelled Saba to move to Nogokpo which was then his farmstead.
The first priestess of the deity was Saba’s younger sister Ladzeshie as Saba himself was a mercenary and was always away from home participating in intertribal wars.

Etymology

Nogokpo: Ewe language — E: nor : ge : kpo: a ? 
Will you live here peacefully or crime free?
That was the question he asked anyone who asked to live near him in his new location. This is a warning in reference to his god not tolerating vice.

There is an alternative narration:

Ewe language: Ma ble nye nua nogoe kpo.

Let me tie (bundle) my stuff without troubles.

This narration is in reference to his exodus from Agbozume with his god.

The original name of Nogokpo was Dealakpanaku: You lie, you die.

Zakadza: Fon language - Night crocodile 

 It is noted for its traditional and spiritual shrine.

References 

 4 Felix Kuadugah , contributor —- History and etymology of Nogokpo.

Populated places in the Volta Region